Brian White may refer to:

 Brian White (British politician) (1957–2016), former British Labour Party Member of Parliament
 Brian White (Canadian politician) (born 1951), former Canadian Progressive Conservative Member of Parliament
 Brian White (cartoonist) (1902–1984), British cartoonist famous for 'The Nipper'
 Brian White (cricketer) (born 1944), former English cricketer
 Brian White (ice hockey) (born 1976), American ice hockey player
 Brian White (mathematician), professor at Stanford University
 Brian White (soccer) (born 1996), American soccer player
 Brian J. White (born 1975), actor on TV series The Shield and film The Game Plan
 W. Brian White (born 1967), American politician in the South Carolina House of Representatives

See also 
 Bryan White (born 1974), American country music singer
 Bryan White (album)